The Persian Gulf Pro League (Lig-e Bartar-e Xalij-e Fârs), formerly known as the Iran Pro League of the Persian Gulf Pro League is qualified for the AFC Champions League Play-off round. The bottom two teams in the league are relegated to Azadegan League. In the past, the format and number of teams were changed for various times. Persepolis is the most successful club with seven titles.

History

To the turn of the millennium the Iranian Football Federation decided to create a new professional football league. In 2001, the Iran Pro League was founded as the new top-level football league in Iran. With the foundation of the Iran Pro League also professional football was finally established in Iran. After the Iran Pro League was established as the professional football league of Iran, Azadegan League was declared as the second-highest league in the Iranian football league system. The Iran Pro League comprised 14 clubs until the 2003–04 season.

The first winner of the Iran Pro League was Persepolis, who beat archrival Esteghlal Tehran by one point on the final match day. Esteghlal  Tehran was the leading team after 25 matchdays, but they lost their last match away against Malavan 0–1, while Persepolis could beat Fajr Sepasi with the same score at home. Esteghlal Rasht and East Azerbaijan's famous club Tractor had been relegated to the Azadegan League. Tractor took eight years to return to Iran's highest division. The first top goal scorer of the Iran Pro League was Reza Enayati of Aboomoslem with 17 goals. The next season was won by Sepahan, the most supported team of Isfahan. Sepahan was the first Iranian football champion based outside of the capital Tehran. At the end of the season three traditional teams were relegated to Azadegan League: Aboomoslem, Malavan and Sanat Naft Abadan.

The runner-up of the 2002–03 season, PAS Tehran, became the Iranian football champion of the 2003–04 Iran Pro League. It was the last Iranian championship for PAS Tehran as one of the most successful Iranian football clubs of all time. PAS Tehran's professional football team was dissolved in 2007. Ali Daei, who returned to Persepolis, became the top goal scorer with 16 goals. The 2003–04 season was the last edition of the league with 14 teams.

In 2004, the number of teams were increased from 14 to 16 teams. Foolad of Ahvaz became the first champion from Khuzestan Province after winning the 2004–05 Iran Pro League six points ahead of Zob Ahan. Reza Enayati of Esteghlal Tehran became the league's top goal scorer for the second time in his career after scoring 20 goals in 24 matches. He repeated his success with 21 goals in the 2005–06 Iran Pro League when Esteghlal Tehran celebrated their first championship since 2001. They defeated Bargh Shiraz in front of over 100,000 fans at Azadi 4–1 and won the league one point ahead of PAS Tehran. Shamoushak Noshahr and Shahid Ghandi (today known as Tarbiat Yazd) relegated to Azadegan League.

Persian Gulf Cup

On 12 August 2006, the Iranian Football Federation decided to give the league another name. Since then, the league had been primarily known in Iran as Persian Gulf Cup (PGC). The Football Federation decided this to promote the Persian naming. The name of the Persian Gulf has been disputed by some Arab countries since the 1960s due to political and ethnic differences between Iran and Arab countries. The football Federation decided also to change the logo of the league. The final logo was selected from over 130 designs and unveiled on 14 November 2006. Under the leadership of Iranian football legend Ali Daei, Saipa won the 2006–07 Persian Gulf Cup two points ahead of Esteghlal Ahvaz. Until 2007 six different teams won the league title successively. For the first time in history a foreign player became the league's top goal scorer. Nigerian striker Daniel Olerum scored 17 goals in 27 matches for Aboomoslem. The winner of only two seasons before, Foolad, had to relegated to Azadegan League.

Before the start of the 2007–08 season the number of teams were increased from 16 to 18 teams. The professional football team of PAS Tehran was also dissolved before the start of the season. Instead of PAS Tehran a new club was founded in Hamadan and named PAS Hamedan. This was part of the strategy by the Iranian Football Federation to locate more teams in cities outside of Tehran. In 2008, Saba Battery was also moved from Tehran to Qom. Since then, the club is known as Saba Qom. The championship of the 2007–08 season was decided on the last matchday. Persepolis defeated Sepahan in front of an incredible crowd of 110,000 fans at Azadi by the final score of 2–1. Sepehr Heidari scored the decisive goal in a dramatic match in the sixth minute of additional time. Sanat Naft and Shirin Faraz (today known as Rahian Kermanshah) relegated to Azadegan League. The next season was dominated by Perspolis archrival Esteghlal Tehran and the two surprising teams Zob Ahan and Mes Kerman. Zob Ahan was the leading team after 75 minutes on matchday 34, before they lost their match against Foolad due to three conceded goals in the last 15 minutes with 1–4. In the meantime, Esteghlal Tehran saved their 1–0 lead against Payam Mashhad and won the league due to better goal difference. Last but not least, Payam Mashhad had to relegated alongside Bargh Shiraz and Damash.

The 2009–10 Persian Gulf Cup was dominated by the two Isfahan based clubs Sepahan and Zob Ahan. Ultimately Sepahan won the league six points before Zob Ahan. Sepahan Iraqi striker Emad Mohammed became the second foreign player, who won the league's top goal scorer award. He scored 19 goals, one more than his teammate Ibrahima Touré. Sepahan repeated their success by winning the 2010–11 and 2011–12 Persian Gulf Cup. For the first time in history of Iranian football a team became the Iranian champion three times in a row. Esteghlal Tehran broke Sepahan's success finally in 2013. Esteghlal Tehran won the 2012–13 Persian Gulf Cup and became for the eight time in their history the Iranian champion. During an exciting championship battle between Esteghlal Tehran and Sepahan, they faced each other in Tehran's Azadi Stadium on week 32. Moharram Navidkia scored the opening goal for Sepahan, however Esteghlal Tehran equalized in the 94th minute due to an own goal by Sepahan defender Mohsen Irannejad. On week 33 Sepahan lost their away game against Damash 1–2, while Esteghlal Tehran could beat Foolad in Ahvaz with 1–0 and became the 2013 champion.

The League was scaled down from 18 to 16 teams before the beginning of the next season. Foolad won the 2013–14 Persian Gulf Cup after an exciting, though a very defensive season at the same time. At the end, Foolad ranged just 36 goals for the title. On the last matchday four other teams, Esteghlal Tehran, Naft Tehran, Persepolis and Sepahan, had the chance to win the championship alongside Foolad. While Esteghlal Tehran were defeated by Tractor at home with 1–3 and lost their AFC Champions League spot, Persepolis won their away game against Esteghlal Khuzestan with 1–0. Sepahan and Naft Tehran faced each other directly. Also Sepahan lost their AFC Champions League spot although they won the match with 1–0. Both teams had the same goal difference but Naft Tehran scored more goals in the season. Finally Foolad saved their championship after they defeated Gostaresh Foulad away by a goal of Mehrdad Jama'ati.

Persian Gulf Pro League

The league changed its name from Persian Gulf Cup to Persian Gulf Pro League in 2014. The Iranian Football Federation decided also to change the logos of the Persian Gulf Pro League and of the Azadegan League. The 2014–15 Persian Gulf Pro League was embossed by an exciting championship battle between Sepahan, Tractor and Naft Tehran. Tractor was ahead of their opponents Naft Tehran on goal difference, and a point of Sepahan. Tractor and Naft Tehran faced each other at Sahand, while Sepahan had to play Saipa at home. Tractor were in front 3–1 after an hour thanks to goals from Brazilian striker Edinho, Andranik Teymourian and Farid Karimi. But, then the game started to turn worse for Tractor. A very controversial red card for national team captain Andranik Teymourian and two goals by the visitors destroyed Tractor dreams. Furthermore, there were strange events in the stadium, including a lot of misinformation and disturbed telecommunication. Although Sepahan secured their title with a 2–0 victory over Saipa, thousands of Tractor supporters celebrated on the pitch, believing that they won the league for the first time in club's history.

Also the 2015–16 Persian Gulf Pro League was not decided until the last matchday. Thanks to two goals from Rahim Zahivi at the last matchday against Zob Ahan, the Ahvaz based team Esteghlal Khuzestan won the league sensational in front of Persepolis and Esteghlal Tehran. Persepolis missed their big opportunity winning the league after eight years. They were shocked on matchday 28 as they lost their match against Naft Tehran 0–2 at a packed Azadi. However, Persepolis dominated the next season and won the 2016–17 Persian Gulf Pro League clear before Esteghlal Tehran and Tractor. Persepolis football team claimed the Iran Professional League (IPL) with three games to spare and repeated the title in 2017-18 Season. The Following Season Persepolis again were champion for three times in a row.

Format
In the past, the number of teams were changed for various times. Since 2013, the league comprises 16 teams. Over the course of a season, which runs annually from July to the following May, each team plays twice against the others in the league, once at home and once away, resulting in each team competing in 30 games in total. Three points are awarded for a win, one for a draw and zero for a loss. The teams are ranked in the league table by points gained, then goal difference, then goals scored and then their head-to-head record for that season.

At the end of the season, the club with the most points becomes the Iranian champion. Currently, the Championand the Hazfi Cup champion qualify automatically for the group phase of the AFC Champions League, while the second and third-place teams enter the AFC Champions League at the Play-off round. The bottom two teams are relegated to Azadegan League. Furthermore, all teams in the Persian Gulf Pro League can participate in the Hazfi Cup.

Logo

Ranking

Updated on 7 December 2021.(Source)

Clubs (2022–23)

Champions

Persian Gulf Pro League

Total

All-time Pro League table

Source: iplstats.com
Notes:Only league matches; play-offs are not included in the all-time table.  1 Esteghlal Tehran was deducted one point in the 2013–14 season.  2 Persepolis was deducted six points in the 2005–06 season.  3 Persepolis was deducted six points in the 2007–08 season.  4 Persepolis was deducted one point in the 2013–14 season.  5 Sepahan was deducted three points in the 2007–08 season.  6 Zob Ahan was deducted one point in the 2005–06 season.  7 Tractor was deducted one point in the 2013–14 season.  8 Malavan was deducted one point in the 2013–14 season.  9 PAS Tehran was deducted one point in the 2006–07 season.  10 Damash was deducted one point in the 2013–14 season.  11 Steel Azin was formerly known as Ekbatan.  12 Rahian Kermanshah was formerly known as Shirin Faraz.  13 Tarbiat Yazd was formerly known as Shahid Ghandi.  14 Gahar Zagros was formerly known as Damash Lorestan.  15 Shahr Khodro was deducted six points in the 2017–18 season.

Attendances

Average league attendances
 

Notes:Matches with spectator bans are not included in average attendances.The official game reports can be found under the match schedule on iranleague.ir. The viewer numbers are noted in these. This results in average attendance.

Highest attended season matches

Records

All-Time Persian Gulf League Top Scorers

Players in bold are still active in the league.

*GPGR: Goals Per Game Ratio

All-time top appearances in Iran league

Broadcasting and sponsorship

Broadcasting

The state-owned television channel IRIB has the broadcasting rights for the most matches of the Persian Gulf Pro League, Azadegan League and Hazfi Cup. Each match of Esteghlal Tehran and Persepolis is broadcasting by IRIB TV3, IRIB's popular channel. In addition to that Esteghlal Tehran and Persepolis playing not at the same time with the exception of the Sorkhabi derby and the last two matchdays of each season. IRIB Varzesh shows other important matches, while the remaining games are shown on IRIB regional channels. Furthermore, Navad, a popular weekly football program broadcast by IRIB TV3, shows highlights of all Persian Gulf Pro League and Azadegan League matches.

Sponsorship
The Persian Gulf Pro League has been sponsored since 2005. There have been four sponsors since the league's formation.

 2001–2005: no sponsor
 2005–2007: Zamzam
 2007–2009: Padideh
 2009–2014: Irancell 
 2014–2016: Sun Star
 2016–present: Fanap

Ownership

See also
 Football in Iran
 Iranian football league system
 Azadegan League
 League 2
 League 3
 Hazfi Cup
 Iranian Super Cup

Notes

References

External links

 Persian Gulf Pro League official website
 Persian Gulf Pro League at Soccerway.com
 List of Iran all-time top scorers at RSSSF

 

 
1
Iran
2001 establishments in Iran
Sports leagues established in 2001
Professional sports leagues in Iran